This list of majority-Black counties in the United States covers the counties and county-equivalents in the 50 U.S. states, the District of Columbia, and the territory of Puerto Rico and the population in each county that is Black or African American.

The data source for the list is the 2020 United States Census.

At the time of the 2020 Census, there were 47.5 million Americans who were Black (either alone or in combination), making up 14.2% of the U.S. population. State by state, the highest number of Black Americans could be found in Texas (3.96 million), Florida (3.70 million), Georgia (3.54 million), New York state (3.53 million), and California (2.83 million). Meanwhile, the highest proportions of African Americans were in the District of Columbia (44.17%), Mississippi (37.94%), Louisiana (33.13%), Georgia (33.03%), and Maryland (32.01%).

Throughout the country, there are 104 county-equivalents where over 50% of the population identified as Black (either alone or in combination). 25 of these were Mississippian counties, 22 more were counties in Georgia, and 11 of them were in Alabama. Moreover, there were nine counties in each South Carolina and Virginia with Black majorities. North Carolina had eight majority-Black counties, Louisiana had seven, Arkansas had six, Maryland had three, Tennessee had two, and Florida and Puerto Rico each had one majority-Black county.

In 2020, the most populated counties which had a Black majority were Prince George's County, Maryland (population 967K), Shelby County, Tennessee (population 930K), DeKalb County, Georgia (population 764K), Baltimore City, Maryland (population 586K), and Orleans Parish, Louisiana (population 384K).

List

The list below displays each majority-Black county (or county-equivalent) in the fifty U.S. states, the District of Columbia, and Puerto Rico. It includes the county's total population, the number of Black people in the county, and the percentage of people in the county who are Black as of the 2020 Census. The table is initially sorted by the Black proportion of each county but is sortable by any of its columns, as can be found by clicking the table headers.

Counties in Puerto Rico are shaded in yellow.
Counties where people who are Black alone do not make a majority while people who are either Black Alone or in combination with another race do make a majority are italicized.

See also
 African Americans
 List of U.S. states and territories by African-American population
 List of U.S. cities with large Black populations
 Black Belt (region of Alabama)
 List of majority-Hispanic or Latino counties in the United States

References

Lists of counties of the United States
Lists of United States populated places by ethnic group
African-American demographics
African American-related lists